Molly Ockett (also "Mollyockett", "Mollocket" and "Molly Occut") (born –1744, Saco, Maine, died August 2, 1816, Andover, Maine), was a Native American woman of the Abenaki nation who lived in the regions of northern New Hampshire and Maine during colonial times. She was baptized and given the name Mary Agatha. This became "Mali Agat" when spoken by the Abenaki, which sounded like "Molly Ockett" to English-speaking listeners.

Biography
She was born sometime between 1725 and 1744 and was said to be a daughter of the chief of the Pequaket tribe.

Molly was reputed to be a skilled healer and wise woman with a singular sense of humor.  She is reputed to have saved the life of future Vice President of the United States Hannibal Hamlin when he was an infant.  She was well known by European settlers in the area and her name is still attached to numerous locales in the Androscoggin River valley and surrounding territory.

Molly Ockett was skilled in traditional Abenaki crafts

Her date of death is given as August 2, 1816.  She is buried in the Woodlawn Cemetery in Andover, Maine.  She was reputed to be the last living member of the Pequaket tribe.

Legacy
Molly Ockett Middle School in Fryeburg, Maine, is named after her. 
Bethel, Maine, once held an annual summer festival titled 'Molly Ockett Day'.
Molly Ockett Chapter of the Daughters of the American Revolution (DAR) in Bridgton, Maine is named in her honor.

References

External links
A biography of Molly Ockett

1816 deaths
Year of birth unknown
Abenaki people
Cunning folk
Year of birth uncertain
Native American people from Maine
People from Saco, Maine
18th-century Native American women
19th-century Native American women